Government polytechnic Kasganj, founded in 1983, is a government technical education institute in India. It is affiliated with the Uttar Pradesh Board of Technical Education and approved by the All India Council for Technical Education. It falls under the West zone (Daurala Merrut) of UPBTE.

The college was founded by Narayan Dutt Tiwari (Chief minister), Sunil Shastri (Education Minister) and Urmila Agnihotri (local M.L.A./M.P.).

Degrees
Government Polytechnic Soron Kasganj offers diplomas in the following subjects:
Civil engineering (environment pollution and control)
Mechanical engineering (Production)
Architectural assistantship

Facilities
Buildings include an administrative block, a laboratory block, a workshop, a mechanical engineering block and an on-campus hostel building for students. Workshop facilities include welding, carpentry, sheet metal, painting, foundry, machine shop and smithy.

References

External links
http://www.gpsoron.com
https://m.facebook.com/gpsoronkasganj/?_e_pi_=7%2CPAGE_ID10%2C2958852762
https://web.archive.org/web/20110719040923/http://dte.up.nic.in/result1.htm
http://www.icbse.com/colleges/government-polytechnic-soron/7301/1
http://www.indiastudychannel.com/colleges/14562-Government-Polytechnic-College-Soron-Etah.aspx

Technical universities and colleges in Uttar Pradesh
Kasganj district
Educational institutions established in 1983
1983 establishments in Uttar Pradesh